The middle colic vein drains the transverse colon.  It is a tributary of the superior mesenteric vein, and follows the path of its corresponding artery, the middle colic artery.

Veins of the torso